Xie Zhenye (born August 17, 1993) is a Chinese sprinter. He is the current Asian record holder of the 200 metres with a time of 19.88 seconds. Xie's personal best in the 100 metres of 9.97 seconds makes him the second Chinese sprinter to record a time below the 10-second barrier, after his compatriot Su Bingtian. Xie represented China at the 2012 Summer Olympics, 2016 Summer Olympics and 2020 Summer Olympics where he became the first Chinese athlete to have ever qualified for a semi-final of men's 200 metres at any Summer Olympic Games.

Career

Early career
Xie won the 200 metres gold medal at the 2010 Summer Youth Olympics. In 2011 he set a new 100 metres personal best of 10.36 seconds and a 200 m best of 20.79 seconds. He won the 200 m title at the Chinese City Games that year.

Xie took 100 metres silver and 200 metres gold at the 2012 Asian Junior Athletics Championships. He was also a finalist in both events at the 2012 World Junior Championships in Athletics. He was China's representative in the 200 m at the 2012 London Olympics but did not progress beyond the heats. He equalled the Chinese record for that event with a run of 20.54 seconds and closed his year with a win at the Chinese Athletics Championships. In his opening meeting of 2013 he ran a 60 metres best of 6.66 seconds and broke the Chinese indoor record in the 200 m, running 20.93 seconds.

Personal life
Xie was signed by Adidas as a brand ambassador in 2018. He is currently studying a master's degree at Zhejiang University in Hangzhou.

Statistics
Information from IAAF profile unless otherwise noted.

Personal bests

Sub-10 seconds 100 metres record

Circuit wins

200 metres
IAAF Diamond League
London: 2019

4 × 100 metres relay
IAAF Diamond League
Shanghai: 2016
Monaco: 2017

References

External links

 

Living people
1993 births
Chinese male sprinters
Sportspeople from Shaoxing
Runners from Zhejiang
Olympic athletes of China
Athletes (track and field) at the 2012 Summer Olympics
Athletes (track and field) at the 2010 Summer Youth Olympics
Athletes (track and field) at the 2014 Asian Games
Athletes (track and field) at the 2016 Summer Olympics
Athletes (track and field) at the 2020 Summer Olympics
World Athletics Championships athletes for China
World Athletics Championships medalists
Asian Games medalists in athletics (track and field)
Asian Games gold medalists for China
Medalists at the 2014 Asian Games
Youth Olympic gold medalists for China
Asian Athletics Championships winners
Youth Olympic gold medalists in athletics (track and field)
Medalists at the 2020 Summer Olympics
Olympic bronze medalists for China
Olympic bronze medalists in athletics (track and field)